Tryphena may refer to:

 Tryphena and Tryphosa, women mentioned in Romans 16
 Antonia Tryphaena (10 BC - 55 CE), Queen of Thrace, likely the basis of Tryphena in Romans and in The Acts of Thecla and Paul
 Tryphaena of Cyzicus named after the one from Thrace
 Tryphaena (c. 141 BC – 111 BC), a Ptolemaic princess
 Cleopatra VI of Egypt, also known as Tryphaena Cleopatraina
 Tryphena Anderson (born 1933), Jamaican-British nurse, the first black health visitor in the United Kingdom
 Tryphena Sparks (1851–1890), a cousin and possible lover of Thomas Hardy

In other uses
 Tryphena, New Zealand, a town in New Zealand